Rayampuram is a village in the Ariyalur taluk of Ariyalur district, Tamil Nadu, India.

Demographics 
 census, Raympuram had a total population of 3,267 with 1,619 males and 1,648 females.

References 

Villages in Ariyalur district